Joanne Scott  (b. 1965) is a legal scholar. She is Professor of European Law and head of the department of law at the European Law Institute.

Biography
Scott has previously taught at several universities, including the University of Kent, Queen Mary University, and the University of Cambridge. She has held visiting professorships at Columbia Law School and Harvard Law School. Scott was elected as a Fellow of the Royal Society of Edinburgh in 2012 and as a Fellow of the British Academy in 2013. She is also a Fellow of the Academy of Social Sciences.

Select publications
Kilpatrick, C., and Scott, J. (eds) 2021. Contemporary challenges to EU legality (Collected Courses of the Academy of European Law; XXIX/1). Oxford University Press. 
Kilpatrick, C., and Scott, J. (eds) 2020. New legal approaches to studying the Court of justice : revisiting law in context (Collected Courses of the Academy of European Law; XXVIII). Oxford University Press.

References

Living people
1965 births
Fellows of the British Academy
Fellows of the Royal Society of Edinburgh
Women legal scholars
Fellows of the Academy of Social Sciences